Eugene Sheehy may refer to:

 Eugene Sheehy (banker) (born 1954), executive with Allied Irish Banks Plc
 Eugene Sheehy (priest) (1841–1917), priest and founder member of the Gaelic Athletic Association
 Eugene P. Sheehy (1922–2013), American academic librarian, researcher, author and editor